Kentucky Bluebird is the second compilation album by American country music singer Keith Whitley. His first posthumous album, it was released by RCA Records in September 1991. The album consists of four previously released songs, re-orchestrated demos, and other previously unreleased songs, as well as snippets from live performances that predate his professional music career.

Content
The album features several snippets from various points at Whitley's career, including: a performance that he gave at age eight on Buddy Starcher's television show in Charleston, West Virginia; a radio show performance given as a member of the Lonesome Mountain Boys in 1971; two interviews from the radio countdown show American Country Countdown (then hosted by Bob Kingsley); and an interview with Ralph Emery. Also included are "Lucky Dog" and "Would These Arms Be in Your Way," both of which were included on only the compact disc release of his 1988 album Don't Close Your Eyes, as well as "I Never Go Around Mirrors" from that album and "Between an Old Memory and Me" from 1989's I Wonder Do You Think of Me. These latter two songs were added because they were among Whitley's favorite songs that he recorded. Three of the new songs — "Backbone Job," "I Want My Rib Back" and the title track — had already been recorded by Whitley as demos, with new musical accompaniment added by producer Garth Fundis. The rest of the songs on the album were to have been included on an album that was never released. Kenny Chesney later recorded "I Want My Rib Back" on his 1994 debut album In My Wildest Dreams, "Brotherly Love" was originally a single for Moe Bandy in 1989, and Wade Hayes covered the title track on his 1995 debut album Old Enough to Know Better. Glen Campbell had previously recorded "Somebody's Doin' Me Right" on his 1991 album Unconditional Love.

Of the new material on Kentucky Bluebird, two songs were released as singles: "Brotherly Love," a duet with Earl Thomas Conley, and "Somebody's Doin' Me Right." Respectively, these reached numbers 2 and 15 on the U.S. Billboard Hot Country Singles & Tracks (now Hot Country Songs) charts, with the latter becoming Whitley's last top 40 country hit. The album itself peaked at number 45 on Top Country Albums.

Critical reception
Alanna Nash of Entertainment Weekly gave the album an A rating, saying that while it did not function as a greatest hits album, it "contain[s] some of Whitley's best moments on record[…] paired here with crisp new instrumental backings." Allmusic critic Al Campbell gave it three stars out of five, calling the album "a documentary of sorts" and "definitely not a first-purchase disc, but a recommended curio."

Track listing
Buddy Starcher Show (from Charleston, West Virginia, ca. 1962) – 0:56
"Going Home" (Troy Seals, John Schneider) – 4:00
"Lucky Dog" (Verlon Thompson, Bill Caswell) – 2:00
"That's Where I Want to Take Our Love" (Hank Cochran, Dean Dillon) – 3:13
"Somebody's Doin' Me Right" (J. Fred Knobloch, Paul Overstreet, Dan Tyler) – 3:50
American Country Countdown interview excerpt – 0:33
"I Never Go Around Mirrors" (Sanger D. Shafer, Lefty Frizzell) – 4:24
Lonesome Mountain Boys Radio Show, circa 1972 / American Country Countdown interview excerpts – 1:10
"Brotherly Love" (Jimmy Stewart, Tim Nichols) – 3:19
duet with Earl Thomas Conley
"Backbone Job" (Keith Whitley, Kix Brooks) – 2:42
"Would These Arms Be in Your Way" (Cochran, Vern Gosdin, Red Lane) – 3:10
"Between an Old Memory and Me" (Charlie Craig, Keith Stegall) – 3:18
Ralph Emery interview excerpt, January 1989 – 0:43
"I Want My Rib Back" (Whitley, Fred Koller) – 3:38
"Kentucky Bluebird" (Don Cook, Wally Wilson) – 3:38

Production
As listed in liner notes.
"Going Home", "That's Where I Want to Take Our Love", "Somebody's Doing Me Right", "Brotherly Love" originally produced by Blake Mevis; additional recording produced by Garth Fundis
"Lucky Dog", "I Never Go Around Mirrors", "Between an Old Memory and Me" produced by Garth Fundis and Keith Whitley
"Backbone Job" produced by Kix Brooks and Keith Whitley; additional recording produced by Garth Fundis
"Would These Arms Be in Your Way" produced by Blake Mevis
"I Want My Rib Back" produced by Fred Koller and Keith Whitley; additional recording produced by Garth Fundis
"Kentucky Bluebird" produced by Don Cook; additional recording produced by Garth Fundis

Personnel
As listed in liner notes.

Eddie Bayers – drums
Sam Bush – mandolin
Mark Casstevens – acoustic guitar
Earl Thomas Conley – duet vocals on "Brotherly Love"
Carson Chamberlain – Dobro, harmonica
Paul Franklin – steel guitar, Pedabro
Allen Frizzell – background vocals
Sonny Garrish – steel guitar
Vern Gosdin – background vocals
Rob Hajacos – fiddle
Emmylou Harris – background vocals
Randy Hays – background vocals
Mitch Humphries – keyboards
Jerry Kroon – drums
Red Lane – acoustic guitar
Brent Mason – electric guitar
Mac McAnally – acoustic guitar
Larry Paxton – bass guitar
Dave Pomeroy – bass guitar, upright bass
Gary Prim – keyboards
Ricky Ray Rector – acoustic guitar, electric guitar
Matt Rollings – piano
Brent Rowan – gut string guitar, acoustic guitar, electric guitar
Bruce Rutherford – background vocals
Billy Sanford – gut string guitar, acoustic guitar, electric guitar
Keith Whitley – lead vocals
Dennis Wilson – background vocals
Wally Wilson – organ
Curtis Young – background vocals

Chart performance

References

1991 compilation albums
Keith Whitley albums
RCA Records compilation albums
Albums produced by Garth Fundis
Compilation albums published posthumously